Yu Cheng-hsien (born 8 May 1959) is a Taiwanese politician. He was the Minister of the Interior from 2002 to 2004.

Political careers

2008 legislative election 

 All registered: 242,349
 Voters (turnout): 156,440 (64.55%)
 Valid (percentage): 153,166 (97.91%)
 Rejected (percentage): 3,274 (2.09%)

Ministry of Interior
Yu submitted his resignation on 19 March 2004 from his ministerial position to take the responsibility over the 3-19 shooting incident on Chen Shui-bian in Tainan City but was asked by Premier Yu Shyi-kun to stay. He resubmitted his resignation again on 4 April 2004 after the demonstration made by Pan-Blue Coalition over the result of the 2004 presidential election had come under control.

References

Living people
1959 births
Taiwanese Ministers of the Interior
Magistrates of Kaohsiung County
Yu family of Kaohsiung
Kaohsiung Members of the Legislative Yuan
Democratic Progressive Party Members of the Legislative Yuan
Members of the 2nd Legislative Yuan
Members of the 1st Legislative Yuan in Taiwan
21st-century Taiwanese politicians
National Kaohsiung Normal University alumni
Feng Chia University alumni
Spouses of Taiwanese politicians